Alscheid is a village in the commune of Kiischpelt, in northern Luxembourg.  , the village had a population of 47.

Alscheid gave its name to the former commune of Kautenbach until 17 April 1914, when the commune was given the name Kautenbach, after its largest town.  Kautenbach was merged with Wilwerwiltz to form Kiischpelt in 2006.

See also

 List of villages in Luxembourg

Kiischpelt
Villages in Luxembourg